Padang is a city in West Sumatra, Indonesia.

Padang may also refer to:

Indonesia
 Padang Island, in Riau province, Indonesia
 Padang dialect of the Minangkabau language
 Padang cuisine, the cuisine of the Minangkabau people
 Sate Padang a meat dish from Padang, West Sumatra

Malaysia
Merdeka Square, Kuala Lumpur, formerly Padang, a square in Malaysia

Singapore
Padang, Singapore, a playing field

Sudan
Padang people, an ethnic group indigenous to Sudan, a subgroup of the Dinka
Dinka language